A supervised psychoanalysis or psychoanalysis under supervision is a form of psychoanalytic treatment in which the psychoanalyst afterwards discusses the psychological content of the treatment, both manifest and latent, with a senior, more experienced colleague.  

The analyst who provides the supervision is called a supervising analyst (or less frequently supervisory analyst).

Training
Since 1925, supervised analyses have been a mandatory part of an aspiring analyst's psychoanalytic training within the International Psychoanalytical Association; and most training institutes ascribe great value to the experience of such an individual relationship about an analytic relationship.

A similar system was adopted after 1948 by the Society of Analytical Psychology.

The danger of uncritically applying insights drawn from the supervision directly to the analysis is however also recognised; and some would stress the importance of developing one's own internal supervisor, as opposed to merely reproducing someone else's thinking in the session.

Length

The term "supervised analysis" is flexible.  It can be applied to such treatment lasting over several years or to a single session; while even practicing analysts will sometimes seek supervision and discuss a challenging case with a senior colleague, or resort to ongoing supervision at times of analytic difficulty.

See also

Notes

Further reading

External links
Supervised Clinical Training

Training of the Psychoanalyst

Psychoanalysis by type